Fuhuodao (复活道 Resurrection Way) is a new religious movement in the People's Republic of China. It has been founded in Henan by Guo Guangxu and Wen Qiuhui in 1990. It is active in Anhui, as well and is a fork of Linglingjiao.

See also
Eastern Lightning
Spirit Church(China)

References

New religious movements
Religious organizations based in China